Pipunculus elegans is a species of fly in the family Pipunculidae.

Distribution
Great Britain, Finland.

References

Pipunculidae
Insects described in 1860
Diptera of Europe
Taxa named by Johann Egger